The Aquificaceae family are bacteria that live in harsh environmental settings such as hot springs, sulfur pools, and hydrothermal vents. Although they are true bacteria as opposed to the other inhabitants of extreme environments, the Archaea, Aquificaceae genera are an early phylogenetic branch.

Phylogeny
The currently accepted taxonomy is based on the List of Prokaryotic names with Standing in Nomenclature (LPSN) and National Center for Biotechnology Information (NCBI)

Unassigned species:
 "Aquifex aeolicus" Huber and Stetter 2001

See also
 List of bacterial orders
 List of bacteria genera

References
 Reysenbach A-L, Phylum BI (2001) Aquificae phy. nov. In: Boone DR, Castenholz RW (eds) Bergey's Manual of Systematic Bacteriology. Springer-Verlag, Berlin, 2nd edn., pp. 359–367

Aquificota